Defending champion Shingo Kunieda defeated Robin Ammerlaan in the final, 6–0, 7–6(7–5) to win the men's singles wheelchair tennis title at the 2008 French Open. It was his second French Open singles title and fifth major singles title overall.

Seeds
 Shingo Kunieda (champion)
 Robin Ammerlaan (final)

Draw

Finals

External links
Draw

Wheelchair Men's Singles
French Open, 2008 Men's Singles